Ákos Haller (born 8 December 1976 in Budapest) is a Hungarian rower. Together with Tibor Pető he finished 5th in the men's double sculls at the 2000 Summer Olympics.

External links
 
 
 

1976 births
Living people
Hungarian male rowers
Rowers from Budapest
Rowers at the 2000 Summer Olympics
Rowers at the 2004 Summer Olympics
Olympic rowers of Hungary
World Rowing Championships medalists for Hungary